Ibrahim Davis Watson-Boye (born January 6, 1998) is an American professional basketball player who last played for the College Park Skyhawks of the NBA G League. He played college basketball for the Dayton Flyers and Michigan Wolverines.

High school career
During his first two years of high school, Watson attended Athens High School in The Plains, Ohio. He was a basketball teammate of Joe Burrow. For his junior season, Watson transferred to Pickerington High School Central in Pickerington, Ohio. He averaged 19.2 points through two years at the school and earned First Team Division I All-Ohio honors as a senior. He initially committed to playing college basketball for Michigan over offers from Dayton and Indiana, among others.

College career
As a freshman at Michigan, Watson served as a reserve and received limited minutes. He averaged 2.2 points in 5.2 minutes per game as a sophomore, helping his team to the 2018 National Championship Game. After the season, Watson transferred to the University of Dayton and found a great home. Watson sat out his next year due to transfer rules. During the 2019-2020 season, Watson served as the sixth man and averaged 10.1 points per game and shot nearly 40% from three-point range. On December 23, 2019, he scored a career-high 30 points in an 81–53 win over Grambling State. As a junior, he was a critical piece in helping Dayton achieve a Top 3 NCAA ranking, and a program-record 29 wins.

As a senior, Watson was named to the Third Team All-Atlantic 10. He finished 10th in the conference in scoring (15.8) and third in three-point field-goal percentage and three-pointers made (.427, 61-143).

Professional career
After going undrafted in the 2021 NBA draft, Watson joined the Atlanta Hawks for the 2021 NBA Summer League, posting 8 points in 20 minutes on 3-7 shooting at his debut, a 85-83 loss against the Boston Celtics. On October 12, he signed a contract with the Hawks, but was waived three days later. In October 2021, Watson signed with the College Park Skyhawks. On December 10, 2022, he was waived by College Park.

Career statistics

College

|-
| style="text-align:left;"| 2016–17
| style="text-align:left;"| Michigan
| 19 || 1 || 4.4 || .345 || .056 || .750 || .4 || .1 || .1 || .0 || 1.3
|-
| style="text-align:left;"| 2017–18
| style="text-align:left;"| Michigan
| 26 || 0 || 5.2 || .389 || .323 || .545 || .8 || .3 || .3 || .0 || 2.2
|-
| style="text-align:left;"| 2018–19
| style="text-align:left;"| Dayton
| style="text-align:center;" colspan="11"|  Redshirt
|-
| style="text-align:left;"| 2019–20
| style="text-align:left;"| Dayton
| 31 || 1 || 22.5 || .498 || .393 || .845 || 2.4 || 1.3 || .2 || .3 || 10.1
|-
| style="text-align:left;"| 2020–21
| style="text-align:left;"| Dayton
| 24 || 24 || 37.1 || .467 || .416 || .757 || 4.1 || 1.9 || .5 || .3 || 15.7
|- class="sortbottom"
| style="text-align:center;" colspan="2"| Career
| 100 || 26 || 18.1 || .465 || .378 || .776 || 2.0 || 1.0 || .3 || .2 || 7.7

References

External links
Dayton Flyers bio
Michigan Wolverines bio

1998 births
Living people
American men's basketball players
Basketball players from Atlanta
College Park Skyhawks players
Dayton Flyers men's basketball players
Michigan Wolverines men's basketball players
Shooting guards